Chi Chi is a song by American R&B singers Trey Songz and Chris Brown, released as a standalone single on February 4, 2019.

Background
In January 2019 Songz premiered, on Instagram, two "just registered" tracks, where he duetted with Brown; a hip-hop-infused track ("Chi Chi") and a funky R&B record called "Ain't No Thing". The following month, Songz decided to release "Chi Chi" as an official single.

Track listing

Charts

References

Trey Songz songs
Chris Brown songs
2019 singles
2019 songs
Atlantic Records singles
Songs written by Trey Songz
Songs written by Chris Brown